The International Society for the Empirical Study of Literature and Media (IGEL: Internationale Gesellschaft für Empirische Literaturwissenschaft) is a learned society with the object of promoting empirical approach to the study of literature and culture.

History
The society was founded in 1987 by Siegfried J. Schmidt of the University of Siegen. In 2010 IGEL became a registered society; it is registered as a Foundation in the Netherlands. The actual president is the psychologist Don Kuiken.

Governance
The Society is led by a governing board. Members of the board are the president, a vice-president, treasurer, secretary, member at large, journal editor, and student representative. The board is elected at the bi-annual meeting usually held in August/September for a two or four-year term. Presidents of IGEL:
 1987-1988: Siegfried J. Schmidt, University of Siegen
 1988-1990: Elrud Ibsch, VU University Amsterdam
 1990-1992: Arthur C. Graesser, University of Memphis
 1992-1994: László Halász, Hungarian Academy of Sciences
 1994-1996: Steven Tötösy de Zepetnek, University of Alberta
 1996-1998: Els B. Andringa, Utrecht University
 1998-2000: Gerald C. Cuphik, University of Toronto
 2000-2002: János László, University of Pécs
 2002-2004: David S. Miall, University of Alberta
 2004-2006: Willie van Peer, University of Munich
 2006-2008: Max Louwerse, University of Memphis
 2008-2012: Marisa Bortolussi, University of Alberta
 2012-2016: Frank Hakemulder, Utrecht University
 2016-2020: Don Kuiken, University of Alberta

Conferences
The Society holds biennial conferences, alternating between Europe and North America.
 1987: Siegen
 1990: Amsterdam
 1992: Memphis
 1994: Budapest
 1996: Edmonton
 1998: Utrecht
 2000: Toronto
 2002: Pécs
 2004: Edmonton
 2006: München
 2008: Memphis
 2010: Utrecht
 2012: Montreal
 2014: Torino
 2016: Chicago
 2018: Stavanger

Publications
Scientific Study of Literature (SSOL) is the official journal of IGEL. IGEL membership includes a subscription to SSOL.

See also
 Cognitive linguistics
 Cognitive philology
 Cognitive poetics
 Cognitive psychology
 Empirical study of literature
 Literary theory
 Society for the History of Authorship, Reading and Publishing

References

External links
 Official Website
 On Twitter: @igelsociety, #igelsociety
 Society for the Psychology of Aesthetics, Creativity and the Arts
 International Association of Empirical Aesthetics (IAEA)
 Poetics and Linguistics Association (PALA)
 Society for Text and Discourse
 On Fiction. The Psychology of Fiction
 Literature, Cognition and Brain

International learned societies
Literary societies